Mark Bittman (born February 17, 1950) is an American food journalist, author, and former columnist for The New York Times. Currently, he is a fellow at the Union of Concerned Scientists. Bittman has promoted VB6 (vegan before 6:00), a flexitarian diet.

Career 

Bittman is a journalist, food writer, and author of 30 books, including the bestselling How to Cook Everything and VB6: Eat Vegan Before 6:00. He has been the recipient of International Association of Culinary Professionals, Julia Child, and James Beard awards for his writing.

Bittman was an Opinions columnist for The New York Times, a food columnist for the paper's Dining section, and the lead food writer for The New York Times Magazine. His column, "The Minimalist," ran in The New York Times for more than 13 years; the final column was published on January 26, 2011. He also hosted a weekly "Minimalist" cooking video on the New York Times website.

Bittman is a regular guest on NBC's The Today Show and the NPR shows All Things Considered and Wait, Wait, Don't Tell Me. He appeared as a guest judge on the Food Network competition series Chopped and was featured alongside Gwyneth Paltrow and Mario Batali in a PBS series called Spain... on the Road Again in 2008. In 2014, Bittman appeared as a correspondent for the climate change documentary show Years of Living Dangerously.

In 2015, Bittman announced he would be leaving the New York Times to join Purple Carrot (which subsequently received press for its partnership with Tom Brady) as its chief innovation officer.

Books 

Bittman has written and co-written 16 books and cookbooks.  Bittman's most recent cookbook, How to Cook Everything Fast, was released October 7, 2014. In 2005 he published the books The Best Recipes in the World and Bittman Takes on America's Chefs, and hosted the Public Television series Bittman Takes on America's Chefs, which won the James Beard Award for best cooking series. In 2007 he published How to Cook Everything Vegetarian. In 2009 he published the book Food Matters, which covers food-related topics such as environmental challenges, lifestyle diseases, overproduction and over-consumption of meat and simple carbohydrates. He also began the TV series Kitchen Express. Bittman has written the books The Minimalist Cooks at Home, The Minimalist Cooks Dinner and The Minimalist Entertains. In 2010 Bittman created The Food Matters Cookbook, an expansion of the principles and recipes in his prior book. In 2021, he published Animal, Vegetable, Junk: A History of Food, from Sustainable to Suicidal, in which he argues that free market capitalism and corporate farming contribute to the major public health and environmental issues in modern agriculture.

VB6

Bittman has authored VB6: Eat Vegan Before 6:00 (2013) and The VB6 Cookbook (2014), where he recommends a flexitarian diet. The idea behind VB6 is to eat vegan food before 6pm and any food afterwards while limiting processed foods.

The British Dietetic Association named the VB6 diet as one of the "Top 5 Worst Celebrity Diets to Avoid in 2015".

Personal life 

Bittman is a graduate of Stuyvesant High School (1967) and Clark University. He lived in Berkeley, California from 2015 to 2017. He has two adult daughters from a prior marriage. Bittman runs marathons and is a licensed pilot. He now lives in Cold Spring, New York.

Bittman is Jewish, and his grandparents emigrated from Ukraine and Romania. He claims to follow his VB6 diet.

Quotes

References

External links 

 
 Video: Voting with your mouth with Mark Bittman and Ezra Klein
 Video: Mark Bittman on what's wrong with what we eat at EG Conference in 2007

1950 births
Living people
American cookbook writers
American food writers
American male journalists
American television chefs
American male chefs
Place of birth missing (living people)
American people of Romanian-Jewish descent
American people of Ukrainian-Jewish descent
The New York Times writers
Clark University alumni
Stuyvesant High School alumni
Diet food advocates
James Beard Foundation Award winners
Chefs from New York (state)
21st-century American journalists
20th-century American journalists
Aviators from New York (state)
Jewish American writers
Jewish American chefs
Jewish American journalists
People from Cold Spring, New York
21st-century American Jews
Chefs from Berkeley, California
Vegetarian cookbook writers